Iziaslav Yaroslavich (1024 – 3 October 1078, baptized as Demetrius) was a Kniaz' (Prince) of Turov and Grand Prince of Kiev from 1054.

Iziaslav's children Yaropolk and Sviatopolk would rule the Turov Principality. Their authority was mainly challenged by the Rostilavichi of Rostislav Vsevolodovich.

Biography
Iziaslav was the oldest son of Yaroslav I the Wise by his second wife Ingigerd Olafsdottir. Iziaslav succeeded his father, after Yaroslav's oldest child, Vladimir (the only child by Yaroslav's first wife), had predeceased his father. Iziaslav was one of the authors of "Pravda Yaroslavichiv" – a part of the first legal code of Rus, called Russkaya Pravda.

He is also credited with the foundation of the Kiev Pechersk Monastery. Prince Iziaslav I of Kiev ceded the whole mountain to Antonite monks who founded a monastery built by architects from Constantinople. According to the Primary Chronicle, in the early 11th century, Antony, a Greek Orthodox monk from Esphigmenon monastery on Mount Athos, originally from Liubech in the Principality of Chernigov, returned to Rus' and settled in Kiev as a missionary of the monastic tradition to Kievan Rus'. He chose a cave at the Berestov Mount that overlooked the Dnieper River and a community of disciples soon grew.

In 1043 his father Veliki Kniaz (Grand Prince) Yaroslav made an agreement with King Casimir I of Poland that recognized Cherven as part of Kiev. The agreement was sealed with a double marriage: Casimir to Dobronega, Yaroslav's sister; and Iziaslav to Gertrude, Casimir's sister. From this marriage were born three children: Iziaslav's son Yaropolk, Mstislav and Sviatopolk. Upon the death of Yaroslav the Wise, his realm was divided between three of his older sons (Vladimir of Novgorod died before that), Izyaslav, Sviatoslav, and Vsevolod, creating the Yaroslavichi triumvirate that ruled the country for the next 20 years.

As a result of the popular uprising in 1068, Iziaslav was deposed and fled to Poland. In 1069 he retook Kiev with the help of the Polish army; however, he was ousted again by his brothers in 1073. Iziaslav turned to the German king Henry IV, Holy Roman Emperor, Polish king Bolesław II the Bold, and Pope Gregory VII, for help on several occasions. Iziaslav became the first King of Rus' in 1075 when the Pope sent him a crown. He succeeded in retaking Kiev once again in 1076, but soon died in an internecine war against Princes Oleg Sviatoslavich and Boris Vyacheslavich.

Children 
Iziaslav had the following children with Gertrude:
 Yaropolk
 Mstislav (?–1069), was a Prince of Novgorod (1054–1067) which he lost to Vseslav of Polotsk. He had a son Rostislav Mstislavich that died in 1093.
 Eupraxia, may have been married to Mieszko Bolesławowic, son of Bolesław II the Bold in 1088.
 Sviatopolk ΙΙ grand prince of Kiev.

Ancestry

See also
 List of Ukrainian rulers
List of Russian rulers

References

Sources
 Martin, Janet. Medieval Russia, 980–1584 (Cambridge Medieval Textbooks)

External links
 Holy Dormition Kiev-Pechersk Lavra – Official site 
 Genealogy of Yaroslav descendants 
 Izyaslav Yaroslavich at hrono.info

Rurik dynasty
Grand Princes of Kiev
1024 births
1078 deaths
Eastern Orthodox monarchs
Princes of Turov
11th-century princes in Kievan Rus'
Burials at the Church of the Tithes